Kim Yong-ki (1908–1988) was a South Korean agrarian movement leader, Christian and philosopher. He was a pioneer in waste land cultivation, and strove to demonstrate through his work that life as a farmer can be fulfilling and productive. His mission was to induce dynamic spiritual, inspirational, and economic change in rural areas of South Korea. He is considered one of the founding fathers of the New Community Movement, the foundation of South Korea's modernization. He founded the Canaan School in Gwangju, Gyeonggi, in 1962. In recognition of his work, he was awarded the Ramon Magsaysay Award for Public service in 1966.

References

1908 births
1988 deaths
Deaths from cancer in South Korea
South Korean Christians
Ramon Magsaysay Award winners